Ohio's 10th congressional district is represented by Representative Mike Turner (R). The district is based in southwestern Ohio and consists of Montgomery County, Greene County, and a portion of Clark County.

Election results from presidential races

List of members representing the district

Recent election results
The following chart shows historic election results. Bold type indicates victor. Italic type indicates incumbent.

Historical district boundaries

See also
 Ohio's 10th congressional district Democratic primary election 2008
Ohio's congressional districts
List of United States congressional districts

References

 Congressional Biographical Directory of the United States 1774–present

10
Cuyahoga County, Ohio
Constituencies established in 1823
1823 establishments in Ohio
Dennis Kucinich